Edward Francis Montague (July 24, 1905 – June 17, 1988) was an American infielder in Major League Baseball with the Cleveland Indians (1928, 1930–1932), primarily as a shortstop. He later became a scout, most notable for signing Willie Mays. He was born in San Francisco, and died at age 82 in Daly City, California. His son Ed was a major league umpire from 1974 until 2009.

External links 
 Baseball-Reference.com - career statistics

Major League Baseball shortstops
Cleveland Indians players
Baseball players from California
1905 births
1988 deaths
New York Giants (NL) scouts
San Francisco Giants scouts